aftown is an Internet-based music download and streaming service. IAftown as a company consists of two main platforms: streaming and downloads. The aftown app is free and generates revenue through premium subscriptions and advertisement from free users.

It is currently the top indigenous music streaming and download site in West Africa.

History 
In September 2016, the technation team had a collaboration with M.anifest to release his album "No Where Cool " album on 15ghana.com, an eCommerce website. The album upon release sold over a thousand copies all over the country within a week. The sale of M.anifest's album presented several challenges especially in regard to delivery since the project involved the sale CDs. These challenges and the overall success of the project led the technation gh team to come up with the idea for aftown coined from the words Africa and Town.

In October, 2016 aftown was officially launched. Upon its launch aftownmusic had its first major sales from Sonnie Badu's album "Soundz Of Afrika". Aftown went on to sell albums from top Ghanaian artists like Sarkodie, MzVee, Akan, M.anifest , Joe Mettle, EL, Stonebwoy, Okyeame Kwame, Adomaa, Teephlow.

Aftown generated about GHC 80 000 in artist revenue in its first year.

The transition from 15ghana to aftown was a positive one, however there were still challenges present that had to be addressed hence the inception of aftownmusic. Due to feedback from aftown users, a streaming platform was introduced in June 2017. Aftownmusic's first big project was with Akan's album "Onipa Akoma" which was a huge success .

Business Model 
Aftownmusic is a free music streaming platform. Revenue is generated from premium subscriptions and advertisements for free users. Aftown encourages users to support indigenous artists by avoiding piracy and streaming local content .Artistes gain revenue from their total play counts.

Accounts And Subscriptions 

Aftownmusic has two distinct apps on both  android and iOS for premium and free streaming. The premieum app which has no ads is called aftownmusic premium  and the free one is called aftown -Discover and stream new music for free. Both apps are available on google store and the app store.

The free accounts in aftownmusic have perpetual existence, however users can move to premium at any time. The duration for premium accounts vary and users can choose between daily, weekly, monthly and yearly packages.

The payment methods available on aftownmusic include Mobile Money (available on all Ghanaian network providers), Credit/Debit Cards, and MTN Mobile Airtime.

aftownmusic Week 
In celebration of its 3rd year on the Ghanaian music scene aftownmusic hosted a week long celebration which consisted of a wide array of activities for its clients both artists and music lovers. This was topped off with a music concert at Alliance Francaise. Some of the events created

Industry Initiatives 
Aftownmusic has hosted several workshops with musicians all over the country in a bid to educate them about branding and revenue making streams. Aftown has also worked with several local artists to produce EPs and concerts.

aftown Referrals 
This is a system adopted by aftown to allow bloggers and promoters make some money. This allows bloggers and anyone place a special link to their web pages that redirects to aftown's digital shop. When a purchase is made via this unique link the bloggers get a cut of each sale.

The aftownshow 
Currently, aftownmusic has a music show on DGN TV. The aftownshow plays a chart of the top 10 most streamed songs on aftownmusic. There is also the listening session, where guests are invited to listen to random songs and give their comments. Mainstream and upcoming artists are invited for an interview to talk about their works and themselves. Unfortunately the aftown show was cancelled and replaced with a brand new show dubbed aftown BUZZ!

aftownBUZZ! TV Show 
aftownBUZZ is a show on DGN which brings you the best of news and insights from the entertainment industry .

MTN Partnership 
In January 2019, MTN Ghana invited aftownmusic to its 3rd MTN digital Music Conference  to help local artists monetize their music. Aftown was introduced to artists as a platform for revenue generation. The event was held in 3 major cities in Ghana.

In February of the same year, aftownmusic in collaboration with MTN Ghana introduced an alternative payment method for MTN subscribers. MTN subscribers can choose to pay using their MTN airtime at a subsidized price.

aftown For Brands 
Aftown for brands seeks to create an avenue for brands and businesses to advertise their products and services to its users. The ads are only visible to free users. The ads presented on aftownmusic are in the form of audio and pictures. Aftown for brands also offers  artist promotion packages for artists to promote their works across the platform.

aftown studio 
This free service by aftown provides artists with templates to advertise their music on all social media platforms. All that they have to do is insert their desired picture and song details and instantly create a beautiful and unique coverart for advertisement.

aftown version 3 launch 
The new app dubbed aftown 3.0, comes with new features including a news feature for press, reward points for users and artists, expanded playlist curation options and new avenues for artists to promote their music & make more revenue. The new app presents a music eco-system of its own. A beautiful new interface that blends perfectly with social media profiles. It solves previous challenges in signups, sharing, uploads & more.

Platforms 
Aftownmusic has apps available for Android and iOS. Aftownmusic also features a web player, for those who are unable to – or do not want to – download an app.

References

Mass media companies of Ghana